Wallis, Gilbert and Partners was a British architectural partnership responsible for the design of many Art Deco buildings in the UK in the 1920s and 1930s. It was established by Thomas Wallis (1873–1953) in 1916. Wallis had previously served with Sir Frank Baines  in the Office of Works. Although the identity of Gilbert has not been established, architects who worked with them included James Warne and Harry Beken; later partners included Frederick Button, Douglas Wallis (1901–1968), Agbolahan Adesegun (1935–2008) and J. W. MacGregor (d. 1994). Notable buildings include the Hoover Factory and the Firestone Tyre Factory. The firm also occasionally designed country houses, for instance, Limber and Ripley Grange at Loughton for Charles Frederick Clark, proprietor of the Caribonum group.
The partnership was dissolved in 1945.

Works

 Tilling-Stevens Factory, Maidstone, Kent, 1917, Grade II listed.
 Caribonum Factory, Leyton, London, 1918.
 General Electrical Company Witton Works, Electric Avenue, Birmingham 1920, Grade II listed.
 The Solex Factory, Marylebone Road, London, 1925.
 Wrigley's Factory, Wembley, London, 1926.
 The Shannon Factory, Kingston, London, 1928.
 EMI factory, Hayes, 1927–29
 Firestone Tyre Factory, Great West Road, Brentford, Middlesex, 1928-1929 (Demolished 1980).
 Pyrene Building, Great West Road, Brentford, 1929-1930
 Tower and extension to the 'Alaska' factory, Bermondsey, London 1930s.
 Albion Motor Car Company Ltd Works, Scotstoun, Glasgow 1930.
 India Tyre Factory, Inchinnan 1930-1931.
 Daimler Hire Garage, 9 Herbrand Street, London 1931.
 British Bemberg Factory, Doncaster, Yorkshire, 1931.
 Hoover Factory, Western Avenue, Perivale 1931-1938.
 Victoria Coach Station, London, 1931-1932.
 Coty Cosmetics Factory, Great West Road, Brentford, 1932.
 ASEA Factory (latterly the Hawker Siddeley Power Transformer Factory before its closure in 2003), Walthamstow, 1936.
 Simmonds Aerocessories, later Beecham's Pharmaceuticals Factory, Great West Road, Brentford, 1936-1942.
 Richard Klinger Factory, Sidcup, London, 1937.

The firm also designed a number of bus garages for London Transport and its predecessors  at:-
Addlestone, Surrey
Amersham, Buckinghamshire
Epping, Essex
Grays, Essex
Hemel Hempstead, Hertfordshire
Hertford, Hertfordshire
Peckham, London (demolished 1995) 
Reigate, Surrey
St Albans, Hertfordshire (in collaboration with Adams, Holden & Pearson)
Tring, Hertfordshire
Northfleet, Kent
Windsor, Berkshire

Notes

Bibliography and references

External links

Wallis, Gilbert & Partners - London Historians

Architecture firms of England
Design companies established in 1914